The Wide Awake Grocery Building, at 520 State St. in Belle Fourche, South Dakota, was completed in 1911. Also known as Sly's Grocery, it was listed on the National Register of Historic Places in 1978.

It was deemed notable as "one of the dwindling number of cut stone commercial buildings left in the state. Its architectural importance is enhanced because it displays both rock faced and dressed sandstone ashlar; sandstone, the later type is not normally found"; and as "an important grocery for Belle Fourche since its construction." It was originally called Wide Awake Grocery, then Pomeroy and Glassie, then Sly's from 1922 on.

Over the years its second floor has contained apartments, a high school, and a theatre and site of Belle Fourche social events.

The Belle Fourche Commercial Historic District, NRHP-listed in 1982, included it as a contributing building.

References

Commercial buildings on the National Register of Historic Places in South Dakota
Commercial buildings completed in 1911
National Register of Historic Places in Butte County, South Dakota
Individually listed contributing properties to historic districts on the National Register in South Dakota
Grocery store buildings